The Seville Statement on Violence is a statement on violence that was adopted by an international meeting of scientists, convened by the Spanish National Commission for UNESCO, in Seville, Spain, on 16 May 1986. It was subsequently adopted by UNESCO at the twenty-fifth session of the General Conference on 16 November 1989. The statement, then known as a 'Statement on Violence', was designed to refute "the notion that organized human violence is biologically determined".

Core Ideas 
The statement contains five core ideas. These ideas are:

"It is scientifically incorrect to say that we have inherited a tendency to make war from our animal ancestors."
"It is scientifically incorrect to say that war or any other violent behaviour is genetically programmed into our human nature."
"It is scientifically incorrect to say that in the course of human evolution there has been a selection for aggressive behaviour more than for other kinds of behaviour."
"It is scientifically incorrect to say that humans have a 'violent brain'."
"It is scientifically incorrect to say that war is caused by 'instinct' or any single motivation."

The statement concludes: "Just as 'wars begin in the minds of men', peace also begins in our minds. The same species who invented war is capable of inventing peace. The responsibility lies with each of us."

Founding scientists 
The following is a list of the scientists who founded the statement:

 David Adams, Psychology, Wesleyan University, Middletown, Connecticut, U.S.
 S.A. Barnett, Ethology, The Australian National University, Canberra, Australia
 N.P. Bechtereva, Neurophysiology, Institute for Experimental Medicine of the Academy of Medical Sciences of the U.S.S.R., Leningrad, U.S.S.R.
 Bonnie Frank Carter, Psychology, Albert Einstein Medical Center, Philadelphia, U.S.
 José M. Rodriguez Delgado, Neurophysiology, Centro de Estudios Neurobiológicos, Madrid, Spain
 José Luis Díaz, Ethology, Instituto Mexicano de Psiquiatría, México D.F., Mexico
 Andrzej Eliasz, Individual Differences Psychology, Polish Academy of Sciences, Warsaw, Poland
 Santiago Genovés, Biological Anthropology, Instituto de Estudios Antropológicos, México D.F., Mexico
 Benson E. Ginsburg, Behavior Genetics, University of Connecticut, Storrs, Connecticut, U.S.
 Jo Groebel, Social Psychology, Erziehungswissenschaftliche Hochschule, Landau, Federal Republic of Germany
 Samir-Kumar Ghosh, Sociology, Indian Institute of Human Sciences, Calcutta, India
 Robert Hinde, Animal Behaviour, Cambridge University, Cambridge, UK
 Richard E. Leakey, Physical Anthropology, National Museums of Kenya, Nairobi, Kenya
 Taha H. Malasi, Psychiatry, Kuwait University, Kuwait
 J. Martín Ramírez, Psychobiology, Universidad de Sevilla, Spain
 Federico Mayor Zaragoza, Biochemistry, Universidad Autónoma, Madrid, Spain
 Diana L. Mendoza, Ethology, Universidad de Sevilla, Spain
 Ashis Nandy, Political Psychology, Centre for the Study of Developing Societies, Delhi, India
 John Paul Scott, Animal Behaviour, Bowling Green State University, Bowling Green, Ohio, U.S.
 Riitta Wahlstrom, Psychology, University of Jyväskylä, Finland

Dissemination and Endorsements 

Once it was drafted and signed by the founding group in May, 1986, the Statement on Violence was disseminated around the world, as described in the newsletter that was issued three or four times a year from 1986 through 1994 as well as two occasions later in 2002 and 2003.

The Statement has been published in over 150 scientific and popular journals, including versions translated into more than 20 languages.

UNESCO decided to disseminate the Statement widely in a decision of the twenty-fifth session of the General Conference on 16 November 1989. In 1991, this led to publication and dissemination of a UNESCO brochure in English as well as in Spanish, French and Arabic.  The brochure, with the subtitle "Preparing the Ground for the Constructing of Peace" helped prepare the ground for the UNESCO Culture of Peace Programme.

By the time UNESCO published its brochure, the Statement had been endorsed or disseminated by 75 organizations, including formal endorsements by three of the major social science organizations of the United States, the American Anthropological Association, the American Psychological Association and the American Sociological Association.

Practical implications 

Belief concerning the relationship between warfare and biology may have practical implications. It has been shown that if one believes that war is biologically determined, he or she is less likely to engage in activities to promote peace.  Conversely, if one believes that war is not biologically determined, one is more likely to work for peace.

In fact, according to international surveys in 1972 about half of all young people believed that war was biologically determined. The result was replicated by studies in Finland and the United States. John Horgan reported in 2009 that 185 out of 205 surveyed students at Purdue University believed that humans would never stop fighting wars.

Criticism 

Steven Pinker has criticized the Seville Statement as being an example of the moralistic fallacy. Some scientists believe both evolutionary psychology  and neuropsychology  suggest that human violence does indeed have biological roots.

Pinker has used the Seville Statement as an example of the idea of biological determinism, the incorrect idea that genes are solely responsible for any of our behaviors. A 2008 article in Nature by Dan Jones stated that "The decades since have not been kind to these cherished beliefs. A growing number of psychologists, neuroscientists and anthropologists have accumulated evidence that understanding many aspects of antisocial behaviour, including violence and murder, requires the study of brains, genes and evolution, as well as the societies those factors have wrought." Evolutionary psychologists generally argue that violence is not done for its own sake but is a by-product of goals such as higher status or reproductive success. Some evolutionary psychologists argue that humans have specific mechanisms for specific forms of violence such as against stepchildren (the Cinderella effect). Chimpanzees have violence between groups, which has similarities to raids and violence between groups in non-state societies. Several studies have found that the death rates from inter-group violence are similar for non-state societies and chimpanzees. On the other hand, intra-group violence is lower in humans living in small group societies than in chimpanzees. Humans may have a strong tendency to differ between ingroup and outgroup, which affects altruistic and aggressive behavior. There is also evidence that both intra-group and inter-group violence were much more prevalent in the recent past and in tribal societies, which suggests that tendencies to use violence in order to achieve goals are affected by society. Reduced inequalities, more available resources, and reduced blood feuds due to better functioning justice systems may have contributed to declining intra-group violence.

References

External links 
Full text of the Seville Statement on Violence
Adams, D. (1989). "The Seville Statement on Violence: A Progress Report", reprinted by permission from Journal of Peace Research. 26 (2): 113–121, retrieved May 16, 2016

1989 in law
UNESCO
Political statements
Seville
1989 in international relations
1986 documents